Cristi is a given name and surname. Notable people with the name include:
 Cristi Chirică (born 1997), Romanian rugby union player
 Cristi Conaway (born 1965), American actress and fashion designer
 Cristi Harris (born 1977), American actress
 Cristi Ilie Pîrghie (born 1992), Romanian rower
 Cristi Minculescu (born 1959), Romanian pop singer
 Cristi Puiu (born 1967), Romanian film director and screenwriter
 Elvira Cristi (born 1976), Chilean actress and model
 Jorge Muñoz Cristi (1898–1967), Chilean geologist
 Oscar Cristi (1916–1965), Chilean politician
 Vladimir Cristi (1880–1956), Romanian politician

See also
 Crist (surname)
 Crista (disambiguation)
 Cristie (born 1978), Spanish flamenco singer
 Cristy, name
 Kristi (disambiguation)

Romanian masculine given names